Melechesh is an ethnically Assyrian black metal band that originated in Jerusalem and is currently based in Amsterdam. Ashmedi started the band as a solo project in 1993. In the following year, guitarist Moloch and drummer Lord Curse were added to the line-up. The band's goal was to create a type of black metal incorporating extensive Middle Eastern influences mainly based on Assyrian (Mesopotamian) and occult themes (both musically and lyrically); the band invented the title "Mesopotamian metal" or "Sumerian Black Thrashing Metal" to best describe their type of metal. They are sometimes referred to as oriental metal.

Name etymology and pronunciation 
The name Melechesh consists of two words of Hebrew and Aramaic origins: melech (meaning king; מֶלֶךְ, ܡܲܠܟܵܐ) and esh (meaning fire; אֵשׁ); hence, king of fire or fiery king. The portmanteau was originated by the band.

The digraph ch is pronounced similarly to the Scottish ch, as in the word loch, or the Greek letter Χ. The Modern Hebrew realization of it is the voiceless uvular fricative (/χ/). See Modern Hebrew phonology and Aramaic phonology. In English, an accepted and common pronunciation is me-lek-ESH.

Geographical origins 
The band started their career in Jerusalem (and Bethlehem), where most Israeli Assyrians and many Israeli Armenians live today, and operated from there between 1993–1998; however, they have resided mainly in Amsterdam since 1998 for several personal, professional and demographic reasons.

History 

The band's release in 1995 of the official demo As Jerusalem Burns... and 7-inch EP The Siege of Lachish attracted attention from both underground metal fans and local authorities. Melechesh were accused of "Dark Cult activities" by the law enforcement authorities of the city of Jerusalem, especially by a frontpage newspaper article which twisted some facts. The charges were eventually dropped.

In 1996, the band released their debut album As Jerusalem Burns...Al'Intisar on an American black metal record label; then newly recruited bassist Al'Hazred completed the line-up. This marked the band as the first signed non-Israeli band from the Middle East and also the first international signed metal band from Jerusalem and Bethlehem.

Due to various personal, professional, and demographic reasons, the band members had to relocate. In 1998, armed with a new promo CD "Mesopotamian Metal"  and after a farewell gig in Jerusalem, Israel, Melechesh relocated to France and the Netherlands. Lord Curse remained in Jerusalem and later moved to the US to continue with his Art studies (and now works for George Lucas' ILM company), hence, the band had to recruit a new drummer. Absu vocalist and drummer Proscriptor soon filled the vacant position. From that point on, Melechesh have released two full-length albums: Djinn (2001), dealing with Mesopotamian mythology, and Sphynx (2003), dealing with Mesopotamian/Sumerian mythology while always keeping the dark and Near Eastern occult themes close to their hearts. The band recorded their fourth and highly acclaimed album Emissaries which is available in Europe (Osmose Productions) and by The End Records in the United States and Canada. Meanwhile, Xul has replaced Proscriptor as the band's full-time drummer. A documentary was begun filming the founder, about his plight to create the band. Despite the first director leaving the film after losing all footage he did in Jerusalem another director took over and the project is still on track. Ashmedi's biographical articles can be found on several reputable websites and printed magazines around the world, such as the magazines Decibel and Legacy.  Meanwhile, since the release of the highly acclaimed The Epigenesis, Melechesh have been continuously touring around the world to further promote the album.

On 13 August 2013, Melechesh announced via their Facebook page that both Moloch and Ashmedi amicabliy decided that the former should leave the band, due to academic commitments. It was also revealed that drummer Xul was dismissed in July on good terms. Sirius has been drafted, after one gig the collaboration ended and the position is open for a guitar player. A new drummer will be announced in the future. It is also understood that Scorpios' position in the band is that of a full-time member.

Band members

Current members 
Ashmedi – lead vocals, guitars, sitar, keyboards, piano (1993–present)

Former members 
Uusur – bass (1995–1996)
Thamuz – bass (1995)
Cimeries – keyboards (1995)
Al Hazred – bass, vocals (1996–2008)
Proscriptor McGovern – drums, percussion, vocals (1999–2005)
Xul – drums (2005–2013)
Rahm – bass (2010–2011)
Scorpios – bass, vocals (backing) (2013–2016)

Current live members 
Nomadic Soul – guitars (2019–present)
Nomadic Soul – bass (2020–present)
Simon Škrlec (BOBNAR) – drums (2015, 2016–present)

Session/live musicians 
Simon Škrlec (BOBNAR) – drums (2015, 2016–present)
Kevin Paradis – drums (2014, 2015)
Geert Devenster – guitars
Kawn – bass, vocals (2007–2008)
Malak Al'Maut – guitars (2008–2009)
Rahm – bass (2009–2010)
Aethyris MacKay – guitars (2011)
Scorpios – bass, backing vocals (2012–2013)
Max Power – guitars (2013)
Ralph Santolla – guitars (2013)

Timeline

Discography

Studio albums 
 As Jerusalem Burns...Al'Intisar (1996)
 Djinn (2001)
 Sphynx (2003, 2004 in North America)
 Emissaries (2006, 2007 in North America)
 The Epigenesis (2010)
 Enki (2015)

EPs 
 The Siege of Lachish (1996)
 The Ziggurat Scrolls (2004)
 Mystics of the Pillar II (2012)

Demo 
 As Jerusalem Burns... (1995)

References

External links 

Official website

Israeli black metal musical groups
Israeli expatriates in the Netherlands
Oriental metal musical groups
Blackened death metal musical groups
Musical groups established in 1995
Musical groups from Jerusalem
Musical quartets
Nuclear Blast artists
1995 establishments in Israel
Assyrian musicians